Samantha May Kerr  (born 10 September 1993) is an Australian professional football player who plays as a forward for Chelsea in the FA Women's Super League and the Australia women's national team (the Matildas), which she has captained since 2019. She is widely considered as one of the best forwards of all time  in the world.  As of 2022, Kerr is the all-time leading Australian international footballer, and is the all-time leading scorer in the National Women's Soccer League (NWSL) in the United States. She is the only female football player to have won the Golden Boot in three different leagues and three different continents – the W-League (Australia/New Zealand) in 2017–18 and 2018–19, the NWSL (North America) in 2017, 2018, and 2019, and the FAWSL (Europe) in 2020–21 and 2021–22.

Kerr started her career at the age of 15 with Perth Glory where she played from 2008 to 2012, before moving to Sydney FC. In 2013, she joined the Western New York Flash for the inaugural season of the NWSL and helped lead the team to win the NWSL Shield. She later played for Sky Blue FC and the Chicago Red Stars in the same league. In 2019, Kerr indicated her interest to play in Europe, and having fielded multiple offers from clubs such as Olympique Lyonnais, Kerr ultimately signed with Chelsea, so far winning 8 trophies with the club, including back-to-back-to-back Women's Super League titles, as well as helping the team reach the UEFA Women's Champions League final for the first time in 2021.

Kerr earned her first senior international cap in 2009 at the age of 15 and has since represented Australia at the 2010, 2014, 2018, and 2022 AFC Women's Asian Cup tournaments, the 2011, 2015, and 2019 FIFA Women's World Cups, and the 2016 and 2020 Summer Olympics. During the 2019 World Cup, she became the first Australian player (male or female) to score a hat trick at a World Cup tournament. In 2021, she captained the team to their historic first ever semi-final of a major tournament during the delayed 2020 Summer Olympics, resulting in their best ever 4th-place finish.

Kerr was named the 2018 Young Australian of the Year as part of the 2018 Australia Day Honours, and as part of the 2022 Australia Day Honours, was awarded a Medal of the Order of Australia (OAM) for her "services to football," becoming only the second Australian female footballer to receive such an honour after the inaugural Matildas' captain, Julie Dolan. She was awarded the 2017 and 2018 Julie Dolan Medal as the best player in Australia, is a record five-time recipient of the PFA Australian Women's Footballer of the Year, awarded it in 2013, 2017, 2018, 2019, and 2022, and was named International Player of the Year by the Football Media Association in 2013 and 2014. She received the ESPY Award for Best International Women's Soccer Player in 2018, 2019, and 2022, and was nominated for the award in 2021. She also won the ESPY Award for Best NWSL Soccer Player in 2019, and was nominated for the award in 2018. In 2022, Kerr was awarded the FWA Women's Footballer of the Year. She is the first and only Australian women's footballer to be named to the shortlist for the Ballon d'Or Féminin, and one of only two players (alongside France international Wendie Renard) to have been nominated in all editions of the award since its inception in 2018, ranking 5th, 7th, 3rd, and 3rd respectively. She has also been shortlisted for The Best FIFA Women's Player consistently since 2017, ranking 10th, 9th, 11th, 7th, and 2nd, respectively. Kerr has also been nominated for the BBC Women's Footballer of the Year award from 2018 to 2022 and has been named to the Top 10 of The Guardian's The 100 Best Female Footballers In The World from 2017 to 2022, ranking 3rd, 2nd, 1st, 6th, 3rd, and 3rd, respectively.

Kerr is known for her "speed, skill, tenacity," and backflip goal celebrations, and is widely considered one of the best footballers, and strikers, in the world, and one of Australia's greatest athletes.

Early life

Kerr was born in East Fremantle, a suburb of Perth, Western Australia. Her mother, Roxanne ( Regan), comes from an athletic family: her father and uncles were professional footballers in the West Australian Football League (WAFL) and another uncle J. J. Miller was a champion jockey who won the Melbourne Cup in 1966 with Galilee. Sam's father, Roger Kerr, was born in Calcutta to an English father (a featherweight boxer) and an Indian mother who played basketball.

Kerr played Australian rules football when she was young. Both her father and older brother, Daniel Kerr, were professional Australian rules footballers. She played the sport until switching to association football at the age of 12, mostly due to gender restrictions.

Despite facing some struggles transitioning from Australian rules football to association football, at age 13, she was spotted by Perth Glory striker Bobby Despotovski who described her athleticism and raw talent as "exceptional". At age 15, she made her W-League and international debuts.

Club career

Western Knights, 2006–2008 
Kerr first started playing football as a junior at Western Knights in Mosman Park. After three years at the Western Knights, she trialled for the Western Australian State Team before moving to Perth Glory.

Perth Glory, 2008–2011 

Kerr made her debut for Perth Glory at the age of 15 during the 2009 W-League season. She was voted Players' Player at the 2009 W-League Awards and awarded Goal of the Year for her long–range goal against Sydney FC in round 8. During the 2010–11 season, Kerr started in all 10 matches and scored three goals. She scored a brace in the first half of a match against Adelaide United on 14 January 2011 lifting Perth to a 2–1 victory.

Western New York Flash, 2013–2014 
In 2013, Kerr signed with the Western New York Flash. She made 19 starts in her 21 appearances for the club and scored six goals. After defeating Sky Blue FC 2–0 in the semi-finals, the Flash lost 2–0 to Portland in the final.

Kerr returned to the Flash for the 2014 season. Head coach Aaran Lines said of Kerr, "With her attributes – her speed, athleticism and instincts – if she continues to develop at the rate she is, Sam can become one of the best strikers in the world." Kerr started in all 20 matches and was the team's leading scorer with 9 goals. She was named NWSL Player of the Week for week 9 after recording a brace and assist against Portland. Following the 2014 season, Kerr was traded to Sky Blue FC in exchange for Elizabeth Eddy and a first-round pick—fourth overall—in the 2015 NWSL College Draft. The Flash used that pick to draft Sam Mewis.

Return to Perth Glory, 2014–2015 
In August 2014, Kerr returned to Perth Glory on a one-year deal as one of six Matildas to sign for Perth. She would open her account in Perth's second match against Adelaide United to give Perth the lead in the second half which they would win. The following match she scored a double in her team's 10–1 rout of Western Sydney Wanderers. After missing out in the next four games, Kerr would go and score eight goals in the final four games of the regular season which included a hat-trick against her former team in Sydney FC.

She continued her regular season form in the following season when she scored the winning goal in a 2–1 victory over Melbourne Victory in the opening round of the competition. That would be the only goal that she would score in the season with her leg giving way in a non-contact ankle injury which forced her out for the rest of the season. This wouldn't stop Perth from giving her a one-year contract extension before the start of that season. In the 2016–17 W-League season she scored ten goals, led the team to the Grand Final, and earned the Julie Dolan Medal and the Penny Tanner Media MVP Award. In October 2018, she became the first marquee player of the W-League when she was reportedly offered $400,000 contract to stay in Perth instead of going overseas where she was offered $100,000 less. The marquee signing delivered in the 2018–19 W-League season, when she finished top of the goal scoring charts with 17 goals at above a goal a game. This included a hat-trick in the semi-final against Melbourne Victory which booked Perth's spot into the grand final.

Sky Blue FC, 2015–2017 
In 2015, Kerr joined Matildas teammate Caitlin Foord at Sky Blue FC following their participation at the FIFA Women's World Cup in Canada. Kerr's six goals in her nine appearances ranked first on the team.

During the 2016 season, Kerr made nine appearances for Sky Blue after being away with the national team in preparation for the 2016 Rio Olympics. She scored five goals during the regular season. Kerr was named NWSL Player of the week for Week 18 after scoring two goals: an 80th-minute equaliser against the Orlando Pride and a game-winning goal against the Pride a few days later.

In the 2017 season, Kerr set a new NWSL record when she scored 4 goals in a single game after being down 3–0 to Seattle Reign at halftime. Sky Blue eventually won the match 5–4. At the age of 23, Kerr sat atop the all-time NWSL goalscoring table. Kerr won the NWSL Golden Boot and MVP award after finishing the 2017 season with a record-breaking 17 goals.

Chicago Red Stars, 2018–2019 

On 18 January 2018, Kerr was traded to the Chicago Red Stars along with Nikki Stanton by the Sky Blue FC in a three-team trade with the Chicago Red Stars and Houston Dash. She got off to a slow start in the 2018 season, not scoring until the eighth match of the season when she contributed to a 1–1 draw against North Carolina Courage. In August, she was named as NWSL Player of the Month for the third time in her career as she scored five goals throughout the month of August which included two goals against Portland Thorns FC and Orlando Pride. At the end of the 2018 season, Kerr scored 16 goals and won the Golden Boot for the second consecutive season, leading to her becoming the first player to win the NWSL Golden Boot more than once, and was elected into the NWSL Best XI as a forward.

At the end of the 2019 season, Kerr and the Chicago Red Stars made their first appearance in the NWSL Championship, losing 4–0 to North Carolina Courage. Several days prior to the championship game, Kerr was named the 2019 NWSL MVP, the first, and currently only, NWSL player to ever receive the award twice. Kerr also received, for the third year in a row, the NWSL Golden Boot, leading the league with 18 goals and five assists, despite missing some games over the summer to play with Australia in the World Cup. Kerr was also named Player of the Year by the National Women's Soccer League Players Association, who presented their own awards for the first time.

At the end of the 2019 season Kerr announced that she was considering moving to a European team and had multiple offers.

Chelsea, 2020–present 

On 13 November 2019, Chelsea announced Kerr would be joining the club for the second half of the 2019–20 FA WSL season on a two-and-a-half year contract. Kerr made her Chelsea debut against Reading on 5 January 2020 and scored her first goal two weeks later against Arsenal. She won her first trophy with Chelsea in their 2–1 win over Arsenal in the 2019–20 Continental League Cup Final. Chelsea went on to win the 2019–20 league title despite a curtailed season due to the COVID-19 pandemic, based on a points-per-match basis.

At the 2020 Women's FA Community Shield on 29 August 2020, Kerr created a series of goal scoring opportunities before being substituted in Chelsea's 2–0 win over Manchester City. She scored a hat-trick in the 6–0 win over Bristol City in Chelsea's defence of the Continental League Cup title, and lead goalscoring for Chelsea during the season, ultimately helping her win her second Women's Super League title during the 2020–21 FA WSL season. She scored 21 goals in 22 games, winning the Golden Boot, making her the first player to win it in three different leagues. That same season, Kerr helped Chelsea reach the final of the UEFA Women's Champions League for the first time, before being defeated by Barcelona.

During the 2021–2022 WSL season, Kerr continued exhibiting fine form and was nominated for the Barclays Player of the Month for September. On 16 November 2021, Kerr signed a two-year contract extension, keeping her at the club until the end of the 2023/24 season, saying "I can't see myself going anywhere else in the world or leaving Europe, having what I have at Chelsea." The following week, Kerr scored the winning goal in Chelsea's Champions League group stage match against Servette, and scored her third league hat-trick, against Birmingham City, within 26 minutes, as well as providing the assist for team-mate Fran Kirby's 100th Chelsea goal, with Kerr celebrating her achievement with her signature back-flip, the first time she performed it at Chelsea's homeground of Kingsmeadow. On 5 December, Kerr scored a brace in the delayed FA Cup final against Arsenal, winning Player of the Match, and helping her team lift the trophy and secure the domestic quadruple of the 2020–21 season, the first English women's club to achieve the feat. Kerr ended the 2021 calendar year as the leading goalscorer in the WSL, with 23 goals, and was second in total assists with 10, behind only team-mate Fran Kirby.

Upon returning to Chelsea after being eliminated in the Asian Cup at the beginning of 2022, Sam continued with a fine run of goal-scoring, scoring 10 goals in 7 consecutive matches, the first Chelsea player to do so. She scored the lone Chelsea goal in a 3–1 defeat at the hands of Manchester City in the League Cup final and in Chelsea's 0–9 record-breaking win against Leicester City in the WSL on 27 March, Sam scored a brace, repeating the feat the following week in a match against Reading, the 5th consecutive WSL match she had scored in. On 24 April, in a league game against Tottenham Hotspur, Kerr scored in her 6th consecutive WSL match, and in doing so, broke her own record set the previous season of scoring against the most opposing teams, by scoring against all opponents bar Arsenal. In April 2022, Kerr was awarded the FWA Women's Footballer of the Year, receiving 40% of the vote ahead of Vivianne Miedema and Lauren Hemp, and won the FA WSL April Player of the Month. Kerr ended the season with 32 goals (including 3 goals of FA Cup 2020–21 held during 2021–22 season period) and 9 assists across all competitions, winning the FA Women's Super League for the third consecutive time, and the FA Women's Cup for the second consecutive time. After a formidable season in front of goal for the Blues, the 2021–22 Golden Boot winner was voted Chelsea Women's Player of the Year by Chelsea supporters with over 70 per cent of the vote and was also voted FA Women's Super League Player of the Season. She also received the PFA Players' Player of the Year, in addition to being named in the PFA WSL Team of the Year for second consecutive year. The No.20 finished top goal scorer, netting 32 times in all competitions. Kerr retained the Golden Boot award for the second consecutive year, having scored 20 times in the Barclays FA Women's Super League in 2021–22 season. The striker scored a number of important goals this season, including a crucial 92nd-minute winner against Aston Villa at Kingsmeadow in March 2022 to keep the Blues’ title hopes alive. Kerr also scored twice as Chelsea beat Manchester United on the final day of the season, with her well-taken volley against the Red Devils being voted FA Women's Super League Goal of the Season. The No.20 also scored the winning goal at Wembley as the Blues secured their second consecutive FA Cup.

International career

In February 2009, at the age of 15, Kerr made her international debut for Australia's senior national team in Canberra as a 76th minute substitute in a friendly against Italy, which Australia lost 5–1. She scored her first international goal at the age of 16 during the 2010 AFC Women's Asian Cup final against North Korea, helping Australia draw 1–1 in full-time, which led to Kerr's first international trophy.

2010 AFC Women's Asian Cup, China
In May 2010, Kerr was named to the Matildas squad to compete at the 2010 AFC Women's Asian Cup, the qualifying tournament for the 2011 FIFA Women's World Cup in Germany. After scoring in the second match of the group against South Korea, she scored the opening goal of the final against North Korea before seeing Australia taking out the title via a penalty shoot-out. The same year, she represented Australia at the 2010 Peace Queen Cup.

2011 FIFA Women's World Cup, Germany
In 2011 at age 17, Kerr was named to Australia's 2011 FIFA Women's World Cup squad by head coach Tom Sermanni as one of seven players who were under twenty years of age. She made her World Cup debut coming on as a substitute in the 79th minute of Australia's first group stage match against Brazil. She was a starter for the team's second group stage match against Equatorial Guinea helping Australia win 3–2 and the team's final group stage match and 2–1 win against Norway. Australia finished second place in their group and advanced to the knockout stage where they were defeated 3–1 by Sweden.

2015 FIFA Women's World Cup, Canada

After injuring her knee in December 2014 and undergoing surgery, Kerr worked hard with fitness coach Aaron Holt to recover ahead of the 2015 FIFA Women's World Cup in Canada. Kerr was the team's starting striker during Australia's first group stage match against the United States, which Australia lost 3–1. During the team's second group stage match, she helped Australia defeat Nigeria 2–0. During the match, Kerr was elbowed in the face by Ugo Njoku, which ultimately resulted in a three-game suspension for Njoku. Kerr recovered and started during Australia's final group stage match against Sweden, a 1–1 draw. Australia's finished second in their group and advanced to the round of 16 where Kerr played in the team that defeated Brazil 1–0. She also started the quarterfinal match in the first time Australia reached this stage, but they were defeated by 2011 champions Japan 1–0.

2016–2018 
In July 2017, Kerr was the top goalscorer at the inaugural Tournament of Nations in the United States. She scored a hat-trick in Australia's 4–2 victory over Japan, and also scored a goal against Brazil, leading Australia to win the tournament. Prior to this tournament, Kerr had scored eight goals in her first 49 games for the national team. Her hat-trick against Japan was the beginning of a run of 11 goals in six games. Kerr was named 2017 AFC Women's Footballer of the Year.

2019 FIFA Women's World Cup, France 

In February 2019, Kerr was named captain of the Matildas by newly appointed head coach Ante Milicic. Two months later, she was one of five nominees for the BBC Women's Footballer of the Year award. During the team's first group stage match at the 2019 FIFA Women's World Cup in France, she opened up an early lead against Italy after scoring a goal off a penalty kick rebound, though Australia ultimately lost 2–1 in stoppage time. Kerr's goal was her first at a World Cup tournament and she celebrated by punching the corner flag to honor Tim Cahill, the all-time leading goalscorer for the Socceroos. During the team's second group stage match against Brazil, though Kerr was in an offside position when Monica Hickmann Alves headed the ball into her own goal, the video assistant referee (VAR) deemed that Kerr wasn't interfering and the goal was counted for Australia. Australia won 3–2. Kerr scored four goals in the team's 4–1 win against Jamaica and was named Player of the Match. She is the first Australian footballer — male or female — to score a hat-trick at a World Cup tournament and the tenth footballer to score four goals. Australia finished second in their group and advanced to the knockout stage where they were defeated by Norway in a penalty shoot-out. Kerr's five goals at the tournament ranked fourth highest behind Ellen White of England and Americans Alex Morgan and Megan Rapinoe, who all scored six.

2020 Olympic Games, Tokyo 
At 2020 Tokyo Olympics held in 2021, Australia was grouped with United States, Sweden and New Zealand. Kerr scored in the opening game, in which they beat New Zealand 2–1. In the second game against Sweden, Kerr scored a brace but missed a penalty and ended up losing 4–2. Progressing to the quarter-finals against Great Britain, Kerr scored an 89th-minute equaliser to see the game into extra time, before getting a brace to help Australia secure a 4–3 victory and progress to the semi-finals against Sweden. During this match, Kerr scored a goal that was controversially disallowed, and Australia ultimately lost 1–0. In the bronze medal match against the United States, she scored a goal in a 4–3 defeat, to become the all-time top scorer for the Matildas, surpassing Lisa De Vanna, with 48 goals.

Post Olympics
On 21 September, in their first match after their Olympics defeat, and in Australia's first ever match against the Republic of Ireland, Kerr won her 100th cap, the 10th Matilda in history to do so. She returned with Australia to play two friendly matches against Brazil on home soil in October, the first time doing so since before the COVID-19 pandemic, and scored her 49th international goal in the second match.

2022 AFC Women's Asian Cup, India 
At the 2022 AFC Women's Asian Cup, Sam scored 5 goals in Australia's opening match of the group stage against Indonesia, and in the process, equalled and surpassed the Australian international goal-scoring record, amongst both male and female Australian internationals, previously set by Tim Cahill (50 international goals). She was also able to achieve the feat within fewer matches, needing 105 matches to equal the 50 goals set by Cahill, who set the record within 108 international appearances. Despite being eliminated in the quarter-finals by South Korea, Sam won the Golden Boot, scoring 7 goals in only 4 matches.

In popular media
In 2013, Kerr was featured in an hour-long episode of ESPN's Aussies Abroad entitled, The Matildas, which profiled four Australian national team players (Kerr, Lisa De Vanna, Kyah Simon, and Caitlin Foord) and their experience playing internationally. She was featured along with her national teammates in the EA Sports' FIFA video game series starting in FIFA 16, the first time women players were included in the game.

Kerr was featured on the cover of the July 2011 issue of Australian FourFourTwo along with four of her national team teammates: Melissa Barbieri, Kyah Simon, Thea Slatyer, and Sarah Walsh. In March 2018, she was featured in Vogue Australia as a 2018 Game Changer. In 2019, she was featured on the cover of the Australian version of the FIFA 19 video game. In September 2020, she was announced as the second-highest rated female player in FIFA 21 with a 92-rated card, which was only beat by Megan Rapinoe's 93 rating.

Kerr has an endorsement deal with Nike. In 2019, she starred in a commercial, Dream Further, that aired during the Champions League Final and 2019 FIFA Women's World Cup and also featured Gerard Piqué, Alex Scott, Neymar Jr., Crystal Dunn, and Lieke Martens. The same year, her trademark backflip was featured in the Nike ad, Dream Crazier along with other women athletes like Serena Williams, Megan Rapinoe, and Diana Taurasi and aired during the 91st Academy Awards. She is a brand ambassador for Powerade. In 2021, she published her first book (The Flip Out) in her autobiographical football themed children's book series, 'Kicking Goals.'

In July 2022, it was announced that Kerr would feature on the cover of the Ultimate edition of FIFA 23 alongside Kylian Mbappé, this is the first time a female player would appear on the global cover of the game franchise (Alex Morgan only appeared on the US version of FIFA 16).

Personal life
Kerr is currently in a relationship with American footballer Kristie Mewis. She was previously in a relationship with former Perth Glory and Chicago Red Stars teammate, Nikki Stanton.

A supporter of the West Coast Eagles along with her brother Daniel Kerr, she was made the club's number-one ticket holder in 2019 and 2020.

Career statistics

Club

International 

Scores and results list Australia's goal tally first, score column indicates score after each Kerr goal.

Honours
Sydney FC

 W-League Championship: 2012–13

Western New York Flash
 NWSL Shield: 2013
 NWSL Championship runner-up: 2013

Perth Glory
 W-League Premiership: 2014
W-League Championship runner-up: 2014, 2016–17, 2018–19

Chicago Red Stars
 NWSL Championship runner-up: 2019

Chelsea
 FA Women's Super League: 2019–20, 2020–21, 2021–22
 FA Women's League Cup: 2019–20, 2020–21; runner-up: 2021–22
 FA Women's Community Shield: 2020
 UEFA Women's Champions League runner-up: 2020–21
Women's FA Cup: 2020–21, 2021–22
Australia 
 AFF U-16 Women's Championship: 2009
AFC Women's Asian Cup: 2010; runner-up: 2014, 2018
Centenary Cup: 2013
Tournament of Nations: 2017
FFA Cup of Nations: 2019

Individual
 W-League Player's Player of the Year: 2009, 2014
W-League Goal of the Year: 2009, 2016–17
FFA Female U20 Footballer of the Year: 2010, 2014
 PFA Australian Women's Footballer of the Year: 2013, 2017, 2018, 2019, 2022
 Julie Dolan Medal: 2016–17, 2017–18
 PFA W-League Team of the Season: 2016–17, 2017–18, 2018–19
 W-League Golden Boot: 2017–18, 2018–19
 Football Media Association International Player of the Year: 2013, 2014
 NWSL Player of the Week: 2013: Week 9; 2016: Week 18; 2017: Week 9 12, 17; 2018: Week 15, 22
 NWSL Player of the Month: 2017: May, June, 2018: August 2019: May
NWSL Team of the Month: 2017: May, June, July, August; 2018: July, August; 2019: April, May, September
 NWSL Golden Boot: 2017, 2018, 2019
 NWSL Most Valuable Player Award: 2017, 2019
 NWSL Best XI: 2017, 2018, 2019
 Asian Women's Footballer of the Year: 2017
 ABC Sport Personality of the Year: 2017
IFFHS Women's World Team of the Year: 2017, 2021
 Young Australian of the Year: 2018
ESPY Awards Best International Women's Soccer Player: 2018, 2019, 2022
ESPY Awards Best NWSL Player ESPY Award: 2019
The 100 Best Female Footballers In The World Winner: 2019
IFFHS AFC Women's Team of the Decade: 2011–2020
UK Young Achiever Award: 2021
FA Women's Super League Player of the Month: April 2021, April 2022
FA Women's Super League Golden Boot: 2020–21, 2021–22
PFA WSL Fans’ Player of the Month: March 2021, April 2022
 PFA WSL Team of the Year: 2020–21, 2021–22
UEFA Women's Champions League Squad of the Season: 2020–21
IFFHS AFC Women's Player of the Year: 2021
IFFHS AFC Women's All-time Women's Dream Team: 2021
IFFHS World's Best International Goal Scorer: 2022
Medal of the Order of Australia (OAM): 2022
AFC Women's Asian Cup Golden Boot: 2022
London Football Awards FA Women's Super League Player of the Year: 2022
Football Writer's Association Women's Footballer of the Year: 2022 
FA Women's Super League Player of the Season: 2021–22
FA Women's Super League Goal of the Season: 2021–22
PFA Players' Player of the Year: 2022
PFA WSL Fans’ Player of the Year: 2020–21, 2021–22
Chelsea Women's Player of the Year: 2022
The Athletic WSL Player of the Year: 2021–22
The Athletic WSL Team of the Year: 2020–21, 2021–22
GiveMeSportW (GMS) Fans' WSL Player of the Season: 2021–22
Key to the City of Perth: 2022
FIFA FIFPRO Women's World 11: 2022

Records

Australia (2009 to present)
 All-time leading Australian international female scorer: 62 (from 5 August 2021 to present)
 All-time leading Australian international male or female scorer: 62 (from 21 January 2022 to present)
 All-time leading Australian international female scorer at the Olympics: 7 (from 2020 Tokyo Olympics to present)
 Most goals scored in a calendar year: 12 (2022)
First Australian football player (male or female) to score a hat-trick at a World Cup: 2019
Most consecutive games scored in: 7 (from 30 July 2017 to 28 February 2018)

W-League (2008–09 to 2018–19)
 Former all-time leading scorer: 70 (from 24 January 2019 to 20 March 2021: overtaken by Michelle Heyman)
Most goals in a season: 17 (2018–19)
Most hat-tricks: 4 (tied with Michelle Heyman)
Fastest hat-trick: 7 minutes (16 December 2017 vs Newcastle Jets)
Most 'Golden Boot' awards: 2 (2017–18, 2018–19) (tied with Michelle Heyman and Kate Gill)

National Women's Soccer League (2013 to 2019)
All-time leading scorer: 77 (from 8 July 2017 to present)
Former all-time assists leader: 24 (overtaken by Lynn Williams, Tobin Heath and Jessica McDonald)
 First player to score 50 goals (9 June 2018)
 First teenager to score a goal: (April 2013)
 Most goals in a season: 18 (2019)
Most goals in a match: 4 (tied with Kristen Hamilton and Alex Morgan)
Most shots on target in a season: 54 (2017)
Most hat-tricks in a season: 2 (2017)
Most consecutive seasons to score at least 10 goals: 3 (2017 to 2019)
Most consecutive seasons to score at least 15 goals: 3 (2017 to 2019)
First Australian international to play 100 regular season games
Most 'Most Valuable Player' awards: 2 (2017, 2019)
Most 'Golden Boot' awards: 3 (2017, 2018, 2019)

FA Women's Super League (2019–20 to present)
Most goals in a full-season debut: 21 (2020–21)
Most goals in a calendar year: 23 (2021)
Most number of teams scored against in a season: 10 (2021 –22)
Most hat-tricks against a single club: 2 (vs Birmingham City) (tied with Bethany England, Rachel Williams and Vivianne Miedema)
Most first half hat-tricks: 2 (tied with Vivianne Miedema)
First player to score against every team played against (2 September 2020 vs Everton)
Most goals scored as a headers in one season: 9 (2020–21)
First player to score at least 20 goals in consecutive seasons: 2020–21 to 2021–22
Most consecutive seasons to score at least 20 goals: 2 (2020–21 to 2021–22)
Most 'Golden Boot' awards: 2 (2020–21 to 2021–22) (tied with Vivianne Miedema) 
Most goals across all competitions in a season: 32 (2021–22)

UEFA Women's Champion League (2020–21 to present)

 Most goals in a group stage game: 4

Perth Glory (2008 to 2011, 2014 to 2019)
 All-time leading scorer: 57 (2014 to present)

Sky Blue FC (2015–2017)
 All-time leading scorer: 28 (28 June 2017 to present)

Chicago Red Stars (2018 to 2019)
 All-time leading scorer: 35 (tied with Christen Press) (20 October 2019 to present)

Chelsea (2020 to present)
 Most consecutive games scored in: 7 (26 February 2022 to 3 April 2022)

Other
 Most goals in a FIFA Women's World Cup game: 4, 2019
 Only football player to win the Golden Boot in 3 different leagues/continents: W-League (Australia): 2017–18, 2018–19; NWSL (North America): 2017, 2018, 2019; FA WSL (Europe) 2020–21,2021–22
First Australian female football player to be nominated for the Ballon d'Or
First Australian football player (male or female) to place in the top 3 of the Ballon d'Or: 2021
First Australian football player (male or female) to place in the top 3 of The Best FIFA Player: 2021
First Australian to win PFA Players’ Player of the Year (male or female): 2022
First West Australian-born female recipient of the Key to the City of Perth: 2022
First female footballer to be chosen to be on the cover of a FIFA video game: FIFA 23

See also
 List of A-League Women records and statistics
List of NWSL records and statistics
List of FA WSL records and statistics
List of FIFA Women's World Cup hat-tricks
List of women's footballers with 100 or more international caps
List of top international women's football goal scorers by country

References

Further reading

External links

 
 Australia player profile
 Chelsea player profile
 Sky Blue FC player profile (archived)

1993 births
Living people
Australian women's soccer players
Soccer players from Perth, Western Australia
Perth Glory FC (A-League Women) players
Sydney FC (A-League Women) players
Australian people of English descent
Australian people of Anglo-Indian descent
Australian sportspeople of Indian descent
Anglo-Indian people
2011 FIFA Women's World Cup players
2015 FIFA Women's World Cup players
2019 FIFA Women's World Cup players
Footballers at the 2016 Summer Olympics
Australia women's international soccer players
National Women's Soccer League players
Expatriate women's soccer players in the United States
A-League Women players
Women's Super League players
Women's association football forwards
Western New York Flash players
NJ/NY Gotham FC players
Chicago Red Stars players
Chelsea F.C. Women players
Australian expatriate sportspeople in England
Australian expatriate sportspeople in the United States
Olympic soccer players of Australia
Lesbian sportswomen
Australian LGBT sportspeople
Australian LGBT soccer players
Recipients of the Medal of the Order of Australia
Expatriate women's footballers in England
Footballers at the 2020 Summer Olympics
FIFA Century Club
Australian expatriate women's soccer players
Sportspeople from Fremantle
Sportswomen from Western Australia